Kochmar is a village in Tervel Municipality, Dobrich Province, in northeastern Bulgaria.

References

Villages in Dobrich Province